Otto Duecker (born 1948, Tulsa, Oklahoma) is an American Hyperrealist painter and draughtsman.

Mr. Duecker graduated from Oklahoma State University and became known for his Hyperrealist renderings of floating fruit, still lifes and most recently his near photographic oil paintings of both contemporary and historical celebrities. In order to achieve his desired effect, Duecker relies on traditional oil paint and brushes with a classical application.

Otto Duecker has exhibited his work in fine art galleries in the United States and abroad. Additionally, Mr. Duecker’s work is owned by numerous corporate and public collections including the Philbrook Museum of Art, the Fred Jones Jr. Museum of Art and the Brandywine River Museum.

Notes

External links

1948 births
Living people
20th-century American painters
American male painters
21st-century American painters
20th-century American male artists